Rachel Lauren Stevens (born 9 April 1978) is an English singer, television personality, actress and businesswoman. She was a member of the pop group S Club 7 between 1999 and 2003. She released her solo debut studio album Funky Dory in September 2003. The album reached number nine on the UK album chart and the British Phonographic Industry (BPI) awarded it with a gold certification in October 2003. Two singles, "Sweet Dreams My LA Ex" and "Funky Dory", were initially released from the album: "Sweet Dreams My LA Ex" peaked at number two in the UK and received a silver certification from the BPI.

In July 2004, Stevens released the single "Some Girls" as a charity record for Sport Relief, and the single's success prompted Polydor to re-issue Funky Dory with three new songs. Come and Get It, her second studio album, was released in October 2005. It peaked at No. 28 in the UK, and two of its three singles reached the Top 10. Following the release, Rachel took an extended hiatus from her music career.

In 2008, she came second in the sixth series of the BBC One series Strictly Come Dancing with her dance partner Vincent Simone. On 16 November 2010, she gave birth to her first child, Amelie. In 2013, she was a mentor assistant on The X Factor New Zealand. In September 2013, Stevens announced she was pregnant with her second child and gave birth to Minnie on 1 April. Also in 2014, she was awarded FHM'''s sexiest woman of all time. Stevens became one of the coaches in the 4th season of RTE's The Voice of Ireland. Stevens' version of the song "More, More, More" has been used in adverts for sofa retailer ScS. In November 2014, S Club 7 announced plans for an arena reunion tour, titled Bring It All Back 2015, touring the UK in May 2015.

Early life
Born in Southgate, London, to a Jewish family, she had a Jewish upbringing and attended Osidge JMI School and Ashmole School in London. Her father is Michael Stevens and she has two brothers, Jason and Leigh.

In 1993, she first caught attention by winning a modelling contest sponsored by UK teen magazine Just 17, beating 5,000 other competitors. Following her first modelling jobs, she decided to study at the London College of Fashion, where she achieved a diploma in business. During that time she also worked in a film company and later in public relations, but began to lose interest and decided to pursue a career in singing instead.

Career
1999–2003: S Club 7

The group rose to fame by starring in their own BBC television series, Miami 7, in 1999. Over the five years they were together, S Club 7 had four UK No.1 singles, one UK No.1 album, a string of hits throughout Europe, including a top-ten single in the United States, Asia, Latin America and Africa. They recorded a total of four studio albums, released eleven singles and went on to sell over fourteen million albums worldwide. Their first album, S Club, had a strong 1990s pop sound, similar to many artists of their time. However, through the course of their career, their musical approach changed to a more dance and R&B sound which is heard mostly in their final album, Seeing Double.

The concept and brand of the group was created by Simon Fuller, also their manager through 19 Entertainment; they were signed to Polydor Records. Their television series went on to last four series, seeing the group travel across the United States and eventually ending up in Barcelona, Spain. It became popular in 100 different countries where the show was watched by over 90 million viewers. The show, which was a children's sitcom, often mirrored real life events which had occurred in S Club, including the relationship of Hannah Spearritt and Paul Cattermole, as well as the eventual departure from the group of the latter. As well as the popularity of their television series, S Club 7 won two Brit Awards—in 2000 for British breakthrough act and in 2002, for best British single. In 2001, the group earned the Record of year. S Club's second to last single reached number-five in the UK charts and their final studio album failed to make the top ten. However, on 21 April 2003, during a live onstage performance, S Club announced that they were to disband.

2003–2004: Funky Dory

In 2003, after S Club disbanded, Stevens signed a £1.5 million solo four-album deal with Polydor Records and re-signed with Fuller. She said that breaking out on her own after success with S Club was difficult: "I think we [S Club] ended up conforming to what people's perceptions were. This one was the ditzy one, this one was the singer, this one was the dancer. And to come out of that and be a whole person has been a real challenge for me. I didn't have my say, really, in the group. None of us did". Her first solo single, written by Cathy Dennis and produced by Bloodshy & Avant, "Sweet Dreams My LA Ex", was released in September 2003. Taking inspiration from R&B and adult-style pop music, Stevens's debut solo album, Funky Dory, was released later that month. The album was a hit, reaching number 9 on the UK albums chart and was certified gold. The album also gained praise from pop critics; Jamie Gill, in a review for Yahoo! Launch, said that Stevens "eschews the cheap and cheerful approach of her old band for a slinky adult confidence and musical eclecticism." That December the album's title track "Funky Dory", featuring a sample of the David Bowie song "Andy Warhol" from his album Hunky Dory, was released as its second single and failed to match the success of "Sweet Dreams My LA Ex", peaking at number twenty-four.

MusicOMH called it "musically better than "Sweet Dreams My LA Ex" with a hybrid of pop, Latin and even a hint of jazz infusion" but not a good single choice as a single as it lacked anything special and different. In July 2004, Stevens released the BBC Sport Relief charity single, "Some Girls", which was produced by Richard X. It became a hit across Europe, and reached number two in the UK. HMV.co.uk called the song Stevens's "finest song to date", and Yahoo! Launch commented that "she came to save her career. She ended up saving pop." Stevens then signed a deal with Matalan reportedly worth £1 million and had her hit song "More More More" as the title song for Matalan's advertising campaign.  Following the success of "Some Girls", Funky Dory was re-released to include "Some Girls" and another new track, a cover of Andrea True Connection's "More More More". "More More More" was issued as a single and peaked at number 3 in the UK, giving Stevens her third top ten solo single in the UK. At this point, Stevens and her management stepped up promotion, earning her a Guinness World Record for "Most Public Appearances by a Pop Star in 24 Hours in Different Cities" (seven on 8–9 September 2004). In 2004, Stevens appeared in comedy film Suzie Gold.

2005–2012: Come and Get It and other projects

In March 2005, Stevens released her new single, "Negotiate with Love", that was a top ten hit in the UK. "So Good" was released in July 2005 and also peaked at number 10, being hailed as "tastily produced and sassily delivered." In mid-2005, Channel 4 broadcast a documentary which followed Stevens through the summer as she promoted "So Good". Her second album, Come and Get It, produced by Richard X and Xenomania, was released in October 2005 and peaked at number 28 in the UK. The album was included on The Guardian list "1,000 Albums You Must Hear Before You Die". The third and final single was "I Said Never Again (But Here We Are)", which peaked at number 12 in the UK and was commended by HMV.co.uk for its "astonishingly flawless vocal performance" and as Stevens's "most commercially accessible and quirky single since "Some Girls"." In 2005 Stevens also starred the comedy films Deuce Bigalow: European Gigolo and Spider-Plant Man. From November 27 to December 17, 2005, she toured in UK with the Come and Get It Tour.

In the following years Stevens planned to release a third album, but gave up to focus on philanthropic projects, working in the Make Poverty History for two years. In 2008 Stevens voiced Patrica Ravelston in the animated short Glendogie Bogey.
In August she was announced as contestant of Strictly Come Dancing as partner with professional dancer Vincent Simone. She finished in second place. Stevens and Simone also took part in the Strictly Come Dancing Christmas Specials to 2008 from 2014. In July 2011 a demo track entitled "Nothing in Common", which was recorded for Come and Get It, was uploaded online. In 2011 she released a charity children's compilation Tasty Tunes in a project with toddlers food company Ella's Kitchen.

2013–present: Television, S Club 7 reunion and return to performing
In 2013 Stevens was mentor assistant on the New Zealand version of The X-Factor helping Melanie Blatt with the groups category. On 6 October 2014, Irish state broadcaster RTÉ confirmed that Stevens would be taking on one of the red chairs on The Voice of Ireland as the fourth coach. In December 2014, Stevens attended the Strictly Come Dancing Christmas special and Strictly Tour, a dance show in UK. In May 2015 all seven of the original members of S Club 7 reunited in an arena tour, entitled Bring It All Back 2015. On 12 March 2015, Stevens appeared on BBC Radio 1's Innuendo Bingo.

In 2017 she appeared on the cast of Celebrity Masterchef. In December 2017, Stevens appeared on an episode of Celebrity Mastermind. In 2019 Stevens joined the Rip It Up The 70s theatre show with Louis Smith, Melody Thornton and Lee Ryan.

In 2022, she is competed in the fourteenth series of Dancing on Ice and was third to be eliminated.

On 9 November 2022, Stevens announced that she would be performing at both dates of Mighty Hoopla 2023, an annual two-day pop music festival that takes place in Brockwell Park, marking the end of her solo performance hiatus.

Other ventures

Philanthropy
In 2005 Stevens fronted the Everyman Testicular Cancer Awareness  campaign. Stevens's role was notable as she was the first woman to represent this campaign. Her television commercial raised eyebrows with its suggestive content that included her telling men to "put one hand down their trousers and give their testicles a good feel". On the commercial, Stevens commented, "Sometimes men need a little encouragement to think about their health. This is a funny way of raising awareness about a serious subject." 

In 2005 Stevens also took part in the Make Poverty History campaign, which aims to eliminate poverty in developing countries by cancelling old debts, improving the way aid is given and removing barriers, so these countries can trade more effectively with the rest of the world. Stevens donated an undisclosed amount of money to the campaign, and also starred in television and magazine advertisements supporting the cause. Her official website also displayed the campaign's official online banner.

On 15 November 2011 it was reported that Stevens had recorded a collection of songs about fruit and vegetables as a way of helping to encourage children to eat five portions of fruit and veg per day. The songs were for an album titled Tasty Tunes and were made available as free downloads from the website of children's food firm Ella's Kitchen. Stevens launched the songs with a one-off performance at a nursery in Streatham, south London. The songs include food-themed versions of "Twinkle Twinkle Little Star" and "The Hokey-Cokey", and Stevens said of the project; "As a new mum, I'm always looking for exciting ways to encourage my daughter to try new foods, especially greens. I hope tasty tunes help lots of parents sing about fruit and vegetables as part of their little one's everyday playtime."

Stevens is also an ambassador to WaterAid, an organisation that promotes clean water in developing countries all over the world. During a 2012 trip to Ethiopia, Stevens remarked, "It was such a great feeling to see the women laughing and chatting while they were washing their clothes and drinking clean water. Everyone looked healthier and a lot happier and the village felt full of life."

Endorsement deals
Whilst in S Club 7 Stevens fronted the World Wide Fund for Nature. More recently, she has been the front woman for Pretty Polly, Sky Sports, Marks & Spencer, and Focus Dailies. In 2009, Stevens became the new ambassador for Schwarzkopf Herod Gliss hair products.
In October 2011 Stevens fronted the launch of Seven Seas Health Oils.

 Personal life 
In her earlier years in S Club, Stevens dated property developer Daniel Cohen for about two years. Following the split, Cohen stated he met Stevens socially a few times after their relationship ended, adding "she's an absolute darling, someone I haven't a bad word to say about". On Valentine's Day in 2002 Stevens became engaged to actor Jeremy Edwards. The couple broke up in early 2004. After the break-up she dated Gavin Dein, son of former Arsenal vice-chairman David Dein. The relationship did not last long, with the couple splitting up in August 2005. In September and October 2006 Stevens was linked to American-based English singer Oliver Trevena, known professionally as Oli T.

In June 2008, Stevens became engaged to her boyfriend of 18 months, Alex Bourne. The couple had planned to marry in the autumn of 2008, but decided to postpone their wedding until August 2009 due to Stevens' busy autumn schedule training and performing on Strictly Come Dancing. Stevens married Bourne on 2 August 2009. The wedding was a Jewish one. On 19 May 2010 the couple were expecting their first child. Her first daughter was born in 2010 and her second in 2014. In July 2022 Stevens announced on her Instagram that she and husband Alex Bourne have separated.

Occasional reference is made by the virtual band Gorillaz to a period in which animated lead singer Stuart "2D" Pot allegedly dated Stevens as part of their fictional backstory.

Stevens has stated that she "observe[s] some of the (Jewish) holidays and I'll go to the synagogue on special occasions".

Discography

 Funky Dory (2003)
 Come and Get It (2005)

Filmography

Stage

Concert tours
 Come and Get It Tour (2005)

Awards and nominations

Notes

  Jamie Gill. Rachel Stevens 3. Rachel Stevens Online – originally from Yahoo! Launch. 7 October 2003. Retrieved 5 February 2006.
  Azeem Ahmad. Rachel Stevens 5. MusicOMH. 8 December 2003. Retrieved 5 February 2006.
  Rachel Stevens 6. Rachel Stevens Online – originally from HMV.co.uk. June 2004. Retrieved 5 February 2006.
  Rachel Stevens 7. Rachel Stevens Online – originally from Yahoo! Launch. July 2004. Retrieved 5 February 2006.
  Rachel Stevens 8. Rachel Stevens Online – originally from London News Review. 23 September 2004. Retrieved 5 February 2006.
  Rachel Stevens 9. Virgin.net. 2005. Retrieved 6 February 2006.
  Rachel Stevens 10. HMV.co.uk. Aug. 2005. Retrieved 6 February 2006.
  Rachel Stevens 12. Rachel Stevens Online. 2006. Retrieved 29 January 2006.
 Rachel Stevens 16. The Daily Record. 2006. Retrieved 1 May 2006.
  Rachel Stevens 17. Everyman. 2005. Retrieved 29 January 2006.
  Rachel Stevens 18. RSO: Make Poverty History. 2005. Retrieved 29 January 2006.
  Stephen 4 Stevens", The Daily Mirror. 2006. Retrieved 11 November 2006.
  "Rach's Oli Nice Bloke", The Daily Mirror''. 2006. Retrieved 11 November 2006.

References

External links

 
 
 Rachel Stevens Gallery
 [ Rachel Stevens] at Allmusic
 
 FHM's Rachel Stevens Special

1978 births
19 Recordings artists
21st-century British women singers
Alumni of the London College of Fashion
English contraltos
English film actresses
English Jews
English television actresses
English women pop singers
English women singer-songwriters
Jewish singers
Living people
People from Southgate, London
Polydor Records artists
S Club 7 members
Singers from London